Robert Martin Johnson (born November 12, 1948) is an American former professional ice hockey goaltender who played 24 games in the National Hockey League.

Career 
During his career, Johnson played with the Pittsburgh Penguins and St. Louis Blues. He also played 42 games in the World Hockey Association, with the Denver Spurs/Ottawa Civics and the Cleveland Crusaders.

Personal life 
He is the father of Brent Johnson who has also played goal with the Pittsburgh Penguins. His father in-law is Sid Abel.

References

External links

1948 births
Living people
American men's ice hockey goaltenders
Cleveland Crusaders players
Denver Spurs (WHA) players
Fort Worth Wings players
Hampton Gulls (SHL) players
Hershey Bears players
Ice hockey players from Michigan
Michigan State Spartans men's ice hockey players
Ottawa Civics players
People from Farmington, Michigan
Pittsburgh Penguins players
Rhode Island Reds players
St. Louis Blues players
Toledo Hornets players